Do Balutan (also Romanized as  Do Balūţān; also known as Dobalootan Andika, Do Balūţān-e Soleymānvand, and Do Balūţān-e Soleymān Vand-e Soflá) is a village in Susan-e Gharbi Rural District, Susan District, Izeh County, Khuzestan Province, Iran. At the 2006 census, its population was 65, in 9 families.

References 

Populated places in Izeh County